Giorgio Leoni (born 4 September 1950) is a Sammarinese professional football manager.

Career
Between 1990 and 1995 he was a head coach of the San Marino national football team.

References

External links
Profile at Soccerway.com
Profile at Soccerpunter.com

1950 births
Living people
Sammarinese football managers
San Marino national football team managers